Rob MacInnis (born in Halifax, Nova Scotia) is a Canadian artist, known for his series of photographs of farm animals. In addition to photography he makes conceptual, sound, and installation art.

Career 
Rob MacInnis received his MFA in photography from the Rhode Island School of Design and his BFA from the Nova Scotia College of Art. His prints can be found in private and public collections both national and international, such as The City of Edmonton Public Art Collection and the Museum of Fine Art, Houston. His photographs have been published in newspapers such as The Globe & Mail,The New York Times and in The Point magazine as well as featured on websites.

References

External links 

Living people
Year of birth missing (living people)
Artists from Nova Scotia
People from Halifax, Nova Scotia
Canadian photographers
Rhode Island School of Design alumni